The 1971 National Indoor Championships – Singles was an event of the 1971 National Indoor Championships tennis tournament held at the Hampton Roads Coliseum in Hampton, Virginia in the United States from March 1 through March 7, 1971. Stan Smith was the defending champion but did not take part in this edition. First-seeded Ilie Năstase won the singles title, defeating Ilie Năstase 7–5, 6–4, 7–6(5–0) in the final.

Finals

Top half

Bottom half

References

External links
 ITF tournament edition details

Tennis in Virginia
National Indoor Championships